John R. Zagame (born July 27, 1951) is an American politician who served in the New York State Assembly from the 117th district from 1975 to 1980.

References

1951 births
Living people
Republican Party members of the New York State Assembly